The Seville Metro  is an  light metro network serving the city of Seville, Spain and its metropolitan area. The system is totally independent of any other rail or street traffic. All 22 stations were built with platform screen doors.

It was the sixth Metro system to be built in Spain, after those in Madrid, Barcelona, Valencia, Bilbao and Palma de Mallorca. Currently, it is the fifth biggest Metro company in Spain by number of passengers carried – it carried 16 million passengers in 2017.

History

Original project 

Construction of a metro in Seville began in 1974 with three proposed lines, covering only the city of Seville:

  Line 1:
 Stops: La Plata, Puerta Jerez, Plaza Nueva, Plaza del Duque, Alameda, Macarena, Pino Montano.
 Line 2:
 Stops: Santa Clara, Polígono San Pablo, Alhóndiga, Plaza del Duque, Marqués de Paradas, El Tardón, Rubén Darío.
 Line 3:
 Stops: Heliópolis, San Bernardo, Menéndez y Pelayo, Recaredo, Macarena, Cartuja.

This project was cancelled in 1983 for political reasons with the budget from the central government reassigned to other infrastructure in Andalusia by the newly created Junta de Andalucía and also to the Bilbao Metro project instead, after 5 billion pesetas had already been spent. The official reasons given were fear that historic buildings might be damaged and economic viability.

Revised metro project 

In 1999 a new metro project was started by the Seville Metro Corporation, founded by a former mayor of Seville. It was scheduled to be completed in 2006, but only began operation on 2 April 2009.

The new project plans a network covering Seville and its metropolitan area (1,500,000 inhabitants) formed by four lines, all of them, completely independent of other traffic. In 2018, government officials came to an agreement to build line 3 of the metro system next, with construction due to commence in 2022.

System

Line 1 

 Line 1, West-South
 Character: Underground
 Stations: 22
 Length: 
 Start of the work:  Late 2003
 Completion of the work: April 2009
 Licence holder: Grupo ACS, Grupo SyV, GEA 21, AOPJA, CAF

In 2019 the busiest stations on Line 1 were Puerta Jerez (2,139,000), San Bernardo (1,393,000) and Nervión (1,385,000).

Rolling stock 

The Seville Metro fleet consists of 17 articulated low-floor Urbos 2 light rail vehicles (LRVs) manufactured by CAF. The capacity of each LRV vehicle is of 192 passengers, of which 60 seated and 132 standing. The Urbos 2 LRVs have air conditioning.

Fares 

Fares are based on a zone system with three fare zones on the currently operating Line 1. A single one-way trip that crosses zero zone boundaries costs 1.35€, one zone boundary 1.6€, and two zone boundaries 2.8€.
A variety of additional ticket types are available, such as a day pass and round-trip tickets. Tickets can be reused and refilled with additional fare at automated ticket machines in stations.

Future service 
The total planned Seville Metro network is of four lines, for which no construction has taken place since the Spanish economic crisis . The next line to be built is the north-south Line 3, due to start in 2022.

Line 2 (in planning phase) 

 Line 2, West-East
 Type: Underground
 Stops: 18
 Length: 13.4 km.
 Number of trains: 
 Start of the works:  -
 End of the works: -
 Licence holder:

Line 3 (in planning phase) 

 Line 3, North-South
 Type: Underground
 Stops: 17
 Length: 11.5 km.
 Number of trains: 
 Start of the works:  2022
 End of the works: -
 Licence holder:

Line 4 (in planning phase) 

 Line 4, circular
 Type: Underground
 Stops: 24
 Length: 17.7 km.
 Number of trains: 
 Start of the works:  -
 End of the works: -
 Licence holder:

Tram lines 

 MetroCentro (Seville)|MetroCentro (T1), surface tram through the centre of Seville: Street level.
Stops: Plaza Nueva, Archivo de Indias, San Fernando and Prado de San Sebastián.
Length: 2.7 kilometres
Number of trains: 7 (manufactured by CAF).
 Start of the works: Mid 2005.
 End of the works: Spring/Summer 2007 (Only Prado de San Sebastián–San Fernando–Archivo de Indias–Plaza Nueva stations)

Future tramlines 

 Aljarafe tram. Street level.
 Start of the works:  2005.
 Dos Hermanas tram. Street level.
 Start of the works:  2008.
  Alcalá de Guadaíra tram Street level.
 Start of the works:  2008.

Network Map

See also 
 MetroCentro (Seville) (i.e. Seville tramway)
 RENFE, operator of the commuter train system of Seville.
 Medium-capacity rail transport system

References

External links 

  
 Seville Metro at UrbanRail.net

 
Rapid transit in Spain
Underground rapid transit in Spain